Davit III may refer to:

 Davit III, Caucasian Albanian Catholicos in 769–778
 David III of Tao, the Great (c. 930s – 1000 or 1001)
 David III, Catholicos-Patriarch of Georgia, ruled in 1435–1439